HMS Indus was a 74-gun third rate ship of the line of the Royal Navy, launched on 19 December 1812 at Deptford Wharf.

She was placed on harbour service in 1840, and was eventually broken up in 1868.

Notes

References

Lavery, Brian (2003) The Ship of the Line - Volume 1: The development of the battlefleet 1650-1850. Conway Maritime Press. .

Ships of the line of the Royal Navy
Vengeur-class ships of the line
Ships built in Deptford
1812 ships